Normal Field was the first football stadium of Arizona Normal School, which was operational from 1897 to 1926, when it was replaced by Irish Field.

References

Defunct college football venues
Arizona State Sun Devils football venues
Arizona State University buildings
American football venues in Arizona
Sports venues in Tempe, Arizona